5th Corps, Fifth Corps, or V Corps may refer to:

France
 5th Army Corps (France)
 V Cavalry Corps (Grande Armée), a cavalry unit of the Imperial French Army during the Napoleonic Wars
 V Corps (Grande Armée), a unit of the Imperial French Army during the Napoleonic Wars

Germany
 V Cavalry Corps (German Empire), a unit of the Imperial German Army
 V Corps (German Empire), a unit of the Imperial German Army
 V Reserve Corps (German Empire), a unit of the Imperial German Army
 V SS Mountain Corps, a unit of the Waffen SS in World War II
 V Army Corps (Wehrmacht), a unit in World War II

United States
 V Corps (United States)
 V Amphibious Corps
 V Corps Artillery (United States)
 V Corps (Union Army), a unit in the American Civil War
 Fifth Army Corps (Spanish–American War), a unit of the U.S. Army

Others
 V Corps (Bosnia and Herzegovina)
 V Army Corps (Greece)
 V Corps (North Korea)
 V Corps (Ottoman Empire)
 V Corps (Pakistan)
 V Corps, part of Ground Operations Command, South Korea
 5th Corps (Syria)
 5th Corps (Syrian rebel group)
 V Corps (United Kingdom)

See also
List of military corps by number
 5th Army (disambiguation)
 5th Brigade (disambiguation)
 5th Division (disambiguation)
 5th Regiment (disambiguation)
 5th Squadron (disambiguation)